HM LST-13  was an  of the United States Navy built during World War II. She was transferred to the Royal Navy in April 1943, before being commissioned into the USN. Like many of her class, she was not named and is properly referred to by her hull designation.

Construction 
LST-13 was laid down on 1 September 1942, at Pittsburgh, Pennsylvania by the Dravo Corporation; launched on 5 January 1943; sponsored by Mrs. Jean A. Brackmann; transferred to the Royal Navy on 3 April 1943, and commissioned the same day.

Service history 
LST-13 left Galveston, Texas, on 10 April 1943, with Convoy HK 168, en route to Key West, Florida, arriving 14 April 1943.

LST-13 left from Halifax, Nova Scotia, for the Liverpool on 18 May 1943, with convoy SC 131, carrying general cargo, however, due to defects she had to return to Halifax. She then sailed with convoy SC 132 on 26 May 1943, arriving in Liverpool 11 June 1943.

LST-13 was sent to the Clyde area where she remained until November 1943. She then sailed for Southampton but returned to Clydebank 31 December 1943. She was sent to the John Brown Shipbuilding & Engineering Shipyards to be converted into a Fighter Direction Tender, being redesignated FDT-13 in January 1944.

FDT-13 participated in the Invasion of Normandy from 6–13 June 1944. She provided aircraft control for both US and British fighters defending the main shipping route from the United Kingdom to the invasion beaches in France.

Final disposition 
FDT-13 was returned to the US Navy on 27 February 1946, at Norfolk, Virginia, and struck from the Naval Register on 5 June 1946. FDT-13 was sold on 11 October 1947, to Luria Brothers, Inc., Philadelphia, Pennsylvania.

References

Bibliography

External links

 

1943 ships
Ships built in Pittsburgh
LST-1-class tank landing ships of the United States Navy
LST-1-class tank landing ships of the Royal Navy
World War II amphibious warfare vessels of the United States
World War II amphibious warfare vessels of the United Kingdom
Ships built by Dravo Corporation